Possibility is the sixth studio album by Japanese singer Akina Nakamori. It was released on 10 October 1984 under the Warner Pioneer label. The album includes the hit singles "Jukkai (1984)" and "Southern Wind", as well as the continuation of single Kita Wing - Dramatic Airport.

Background
Possibility is the second studio album released in 1984, five months after the previous studio album Anniversary.

The music production team consist of a long-term collaborators from Nakamori's debut times, such as a Mitsuo Hagita, siblings Etsuko and Takao Kisugi, Gorō Matsui, Kōji Tamaki (member of Anzen Chitai), Tetsuji Hayashi and Ryou Matsuda.

Album track Dramatic Airport (Kita Wing part 2) is the sequel track to the single Kita Wing, which was released in January 1984.

Promotion

Single
"Southern Wind" was released on 11 April 1984, her second single in 1984. The single debuted at number one on the Oricon Single Weekly Chart and became the tenth best-selling single of 1984. In the Best Ten ranking, it debuted at number one and stayed at number 14 in the yearly chart.

It received four awards: Pop Award in the 5th Megapolis Kayousai, Star Award (for first half year) in the 17th International Japan Cable Broadcasting Award, special award from the Yomiuri television and First-half Wired Grand Prize in the 17th Japan Cable Awards.

"Jukkai (1984)" was released on 25 July 1985, her third and final single of 1984. The single debuted at number one on the Oricon Single Weekly Chart and became the sixth best-selling single of 1984. In the Best Ten ranking, it debuted at number one and stayed at number eight in the yearly chart. In the Top Ten rankings, the single debuted at number one and stayed at number six in the yearly chart.

It received multiple awards: Grand Prix in the 10th Nippon Television Music Festival, Yokohama Music Award in the 11th Yokohama Music Festival, Golden Grandprix in International Music Festival from TV Asahi, Best Broadcast Music Award in the 15th Japan Kayou Awards, Most Requested Singer Award in the 17th  Japan Cable Award and Kayo Music Award in the 13th FNS Music Festival.

On 15 December 1984, "Kita Wing" was released in a special single edition Kita Wing/Refrain.

Stage performances
On the Fuji TV music television program Yoru no Hit Studio Jukkai four times. In the  TBS television program The Best Ten, she performed Southern Wind and Jukkai regularly in year 1984.

Dramatic Airport, Blue Misty Rain and October Storm has been performed in the live tour Bitter and Sweet in 1985.

Southern Wind was performed not very often unlike successor single: it has been performed in Bitter and Sweet in 1985, Light and Shade in 1986, Akina Index: The 8th Anniversary in 1989, Akina Yume Special Live in 1991, Music Fiesta Tour in 2002, A-1 Tour in 2004 and Empress at CLUBeX Special Live in 2005.

Jukkai is a well-known performed single in the live tours and dinner shows: it has been performed in Bitter and Sweet in 1985, Light and Shade in 1986, Akina Index: The 8th Anniversary in 1989, Akina Yume Special Live in 1991, Symphonic Concert in 1998, ALL ABOUT AKINA 20th Anniversary in 2000, Music Fiesta Tour in 2002 and A-1 Tour in 2004.

Chart performance
The album reached number one on the Oricon Album Weekly Chart for two consecutive weeks, selling over 629,200 copies. The album was ranked at number 18 on the Oricon Album Yearly Chart in 1984.

Track listing

Covers
Japanese singer-songwriter, Takao Kisugi covered Shiori Labyrinth in his solo single under same title and later included on the album Labyrinth in 1984.

References

1984 albums
Akina Nakamori albums
Warner Music Japan albums
Japanese-language albums